José Said Hilario Godínez López (born July 21, 1975) is a Mexican former footballer who played for Tecos UAG as a midfielder.

Career
Born in Mazatlán, Godínez moved to Guadalajara to play professional football. He played for Tecos' in the Primera División from 1998 through 2009. In April 2008, Godínez almost left Tecos because he hadn't been paid since January due to the club's financial difficulties.

After he retired from playing, Godínez became the president of Tercera División de México club Chivas Mazatlán.

References

1975 births
Living people
Footballers from Sinaloa
Mexican footballers
Sportspeople from Mazatlán
Association football midfielders
Tecos F.C. footballers